Oklahoma State University–Tulsa, located in Tulsa, Oklahoma, United States, is the newest institution of the Oklahoma State University System. It was previously the University Center at Tulsa until it became OSU-Tulsa on January 1, 1999. OSU-Tulsa is unique in the fact that it is not recognized as its own entity, but rather an extension of the main Oklahoma State University campus in Stillwater, Oklahoma. OSU-Tulsa works in conjunction with the main OSU campus and Tulsa Community College to provide Freshman and Sophomore level courses, enabling students to complete a four-year undergraduate course of study. Pamela Martin Fry was named the institution's third president and first female president in 2019.

Academics

The Tulsa campus focuses on junior, senior and graduate level education, providing opportunities for individuals to complete bachelors, masters and doctoral degrees.

Campus

The campus is located north of downtown Tulsa, in the historic Greenwood neighborhood. Tulsa facilities include traditional classrooms, distance-learning classrooms, computer labs, and a conference center area.

The Helmerich Advanced Technology Research Center (HATRC) is a recent campus addition. This  engineering building is home to OSU's School of Materials Science and Engineering and has specialized labs for developing advanced materials targeted to local aerospace, biotechnology, and telecommunications, and manufacturing industries.

External links
 OSU-Tulsa home page
 OSU School of Materials Science and Engineering home page
 Mechanical Engineering at OSU-Tulsa home page
 Oklahoma State University System home page

Oklahoma State University
Universities and colleges in Tulsa, Oklahoma
Buildings and structures in Tulsa, Oklahoma